Kershasp Tehmurasp Satarawala (1916–2001) was an Indian civil servant (IAS), who served as: Lt. Governor of Goa, Daman & Diu & Dadra & Nagar Havelli (1983-1984), Governor of Punjab (1984-1985), Ambassador of India to Mexico, Guatemala & El Salvador (1985-1988).
He was a recipient of the honor of Burma Star. The Government of India awarded him the third highest civilian honour of the Padma Bhushan, in 1983, for his contributions to society.

Biography 
Born on 15 February 1916 in Satara, in the western Indian state of Maharashtra to Tehmurasp Pirosha Satarawala and Meherbai Chiber, Satarawala graduated  from Nowrosjee Wadia College, Pune (1937). He obtained his post graduation degrees from Government College, Lahore, and Command and Staff College, Quetta. He served as a Major in the Indian Army, before joining the Indian Administrative Service in 1947. His various posts included: Collector Dangs District (1949-1952), Chief Controller Imports & Exports (1958-1963), Secretary Gujarat, Industry, Mines & Power (1963-1967), Managing Director and Chairman Indian Airlines (1967- 1971), Secretary To GOI, Ministry of Steel & Mines (1973). He was sent on deputation as Advisor to the Governors of Gujarat (1971–72, 1974-75 & 1980); Orissa (1973–74) Jammu & Kashmir (1977).

Satarawala was appointed Vice Chairman and Co-ordinator of the IX Asian Games  (1982), Lt. Governor of Goa, Daman & Diu & Dadra & Nagar Havelli (1983-1984), Governor of Punjab (1984-1985), Ambassador of India to Mexico, Guatemala & El Salvador (1985-1988).

Recipient of the Padma Bhushan  (1983), Fellow Nuffield Foundation (1963), Burma Star Medal.

Director on the Boards of- Tata Chemicals, Gujarat State Fertilizers and Chemicals, Indian Oil Corporation, Air India, ITDC, and Hindustan Aeronautics Limited and chaired the board of Gujarat Aromatics Limited. Member- Minorities Commission (1981-1983), Indian Wildlife Board (1980-1983), World Wildlife Fund, W region (1976-1981). Vice President Bombay Natural History Society (1980), Founder member of Indian National Trust for Art & Cultural Heritage.

Wife: Frainy Kaikhushru Bilimoria

Children: Three daughters- Phiroza, Anahita, Ferida

He died on 20 August 2001 in Pune at the age of 85.

See also 
 List of Ravians
 List of governors of Punjab (India)

References

External links 
 

Recipients of the Padma Bhushan in civil service
1916 births
2001 deaths
People from Satara district
People from Maharashtra
Indian Administrative Service officers
Governors of Punjab, India
University of the Punjab alumni
1982 Asian Games
Ambassadors of India to Mexico
Ambassadors of India to Guatemala
Ambassadors of India to El Salvador
Government College University, Lahore alumni
Parsi people